2037 is a 2022 South Korean film directed by Mo Hong-jin. The human drama film that takes place among female inmates, depicts the story of adults who want to give hope to the hard-to-believe reality that happened to a 19-year-old girl. It was released on June 8, 2022.

Synopsis 
A 19-year-old girl, Yoon Young, dreams of becoming a civil servant, lives with her single deaf mother and works part time in a cafe. She gets into an accident one day and is raped by her mother's co-worker, who she kills immediately after the incident when he threatens to take advantage of her mom too. Yoon Young is imprisoned after and is called prisoner number 2037 instead of her own name. In this desperate situation, she learns she is pregnant. Depressed by the news, she stops meeting her mother and bonds with her fellow prison mates in Cell room 12, each with their own story, who help her out and reach to protect Yoon-young.

Cast 
 Hong Ye-ji as Yoon Young, a 19-year-old girl who is imprisoned for committing a murder
 Kim Ji-young as Kyung-sook, Yoon Young's hearing-impaired mother
 Kim Mi-hwa as Soon Je, the senior of Cell 12
 Hwang Seok-jeong as Li-ra, a prison hacker
 Shin Eun-jung as Seon-su, prisoner who loves reading and values principles
 Jeon So-min as Jang Mi, the last adultery inmate before the abolition of adultery
 Yoon Mi-kyung an angry troublemaker who appears as a prisoner in Cell 12 to give Yoon Young hope in life once again
 Kim Do-yeon as a prison guard
 Jung In-ki as a prison warden
 Seo Jin-won as a judge
 Hong Seo-joon
 Jung In-gi
Jung daeun

Production 
Principal photography began on May 25, 2021 in Paju, Gyeonggi-do.

References

External links
 
 
 

2022 films
2020s South Korean films
2020s Korean-language films
South Korean drama films
Films set in prison
Women in prison films
2022 drama films
Films shot in Gyeonggi Province